Persephone Unbound is an outdoor 1999 cast bronze sculpture by Beverly Pepper, installed at Olympic Sculpture Park in Seattle, Washington.

See also

 1999 in art

References

External links 
Object information in Seattle Art Museum Collection

1999 sculptures
Bronze sculptures in Washington (state)
Olympic Sculpture Park
Persephone